Chugiak  is an unincorporated community in the Municipality of Anchorage in the U.S. state of Alaska, situated approximately  northeast of downtown Anchorage.

Geography
Chugiak is located between Eagle River to the south and Eklutna to the north, and between Knik Arm to the west and Chugach State Park to the east, where the Chugach Mountains lie.

History
The settlement along the Palmer Highway in an area that had been home to Denai’ina Athabascans for thousands of years was named "Chugiak" on February 17, 1947, by pioneering white residents. "Chugiak" is said to have come from a Dena'ina Athabascan word meaning "place of many places". Chugiak was first heavily settled in the 1950s, primarily by the homesteading by former military personnel who had served in Alaska during World War II. It is currently one of the main sites of suburban expansion near Anchorage.

Demographics

Chugiak first appeared on the 1960 U.S. Census as an unincorporated village. It reported again in 1970. In 1975, it merged with the city of Anchorage.

Present day
There are about 10,000 residents, most of whom work in Anchorage or the Matanuska-Susitna Valley, and are spread out mainly along the Glenn Highway.

Chugiak is also the home of the "Birchwood Shooting & Recreational Park", (adjacent to the Birchwood Airport), the largest rifle, pistol, and shotgun range facility in the State of Alaska. The annual Alaska State Trap and Skeet competitions are held there.

Chugiak has its own post office, with United States postal zip code 99567, which also serves the adjacent small unincorporated communities of Birchwood, Peters Creek, and Eklutna.

See also
 Chugiak High School

References

External links
 Chugiak-Eagle River

Anchorage metropolitan area
Unincorporated communities in Anchorage, Alaska
Unincorporated communities in Alaska